The 2013 Guzzini Challenger was a professional tennis tournament played on hard courts. It was the eleventh edition of the tournament which was part of the 2013 ATP Challenger Tour. It took place in Recanati, Italy between 15 and 21 July 2013.

Singles main-draw entrants

Seeds

 1 Rankings are as of July 9, 2013.

Other entrants
The following players received wildcards into the singles main draw:
  Facundo Bagnis
  Salvatore Caruso
  Flavio Cipolla
  Gianluigi Quinzi

The following players got into the singles main draw via protected ranking:
  Stefano Travaglia

The following players received entry from the qualifying draw:
  Alessandro Bega
  Aslan Karatsev
  Luca Vanni
  Adelchi Virgili

Champions

Singles

  Thomas Fabbiano def.  David Guez 6–0, 6–3

Doubles

  Ken Skupski /  Neal Skupski def.  Gianluigi Quinzi /  Adelchi Virgili 6–4, 6–3

External links
Official Website

Guzzini Challenger
Guzzini Challenger
2013 in Italian tennis